Gerasimovka is the name of several rural localities in Russia:
Gerasimovka, Sverdlovsk Oblast, a village in Sverdlovsk Oblast
Gerasimovka, Ulyanovsk Oblast, a village in Ulyanovsk Oblast
Gerasimovka, name of several other rural localities